Acacia araneosa, commonly known as Balcanoona wattle or spidery wattle, is a shrub belonging to the genus Acacia and the subgenus Phyllodineae that is native to South Australia.

Description
It blooms irregularly throughout the year and produces yellow flowers. It has slender, glabrous flexuose, red-brown coloured branchlets. The pendulous, thickly filiform phyllodes are usually terete to quadrangular.

Taxonomy
The species was first formally described by the botanist D.J.E. Whibley in the 1976 work by Whibley and B.J. Walby Acacia araneosa (Fabaceae subfam. Mimosoideae), a new species from South Australia as published in the Contributions from the Herbarium Australiense. It was reclassified as Racosperma araneosum in 2003 then transferred back to the genus Acacia in 2005.

Distribution
It has a limited distribution in arid conditions of central South Australia in the northern Flinders Range from Balcanoona to Arkaroola where it is found on rocky slopes, ridges and hills in skeletal rocky soils as is often a part of open woodland or shrubland communities along with Eucalyptus gillii and Triodia irritans.

See also
List of Acacia species

References

araneosa
Flora of South Australia
Plants described in 1976